Jang Sung-ho (Hangul: 장성호, Hanja: 張成鎬; born October 18, 1977 in Seoul, South Korea) is a South Korean first baseman/outfielder who former plays for the Lotte Giants of the KBO League. He won the batting title in the 2002 KBO league, and was a member of the South Korea national baseball team that won the bronze medal in 2000 Summer Olympics. At the time of his retirement, he was second on the all time KBO hit list with 2,100.

Achievements
2000 On-Base Percentage Leader
2002 Batting Title
2002 On-Base Percentage Leader

External links 
 
 Career statistics and player information from Korea Baseball Organization
 
 
 

Lotte Giants players
Baseball players at the 2000 Summer Olympics
Olympic bronze medalists for South Korea
Olympic baseball players of South Korea
KT Wiz players
Hanwha Eagles players
Kia Tigers players
Haitai Tigers players
KBO League first basemen
South Korean baseball players
1977 births
Living people
Olympic medalists in baseball
Medalists at the 2000 Summer Olympics
Asian Games medalists in baseball
Baseball players at the 2002 Asian Games
Baseball players at the 2006 Asian Games
Baseball players from Seoul
Asian Games gold medalists for South Korea
Asian Games bronze medalists for South Korea
Medalists at the 2002 Asian Games
Medalists at the 2006 Asian Games